Shaofu Zhuyu Wan is a blackish-brown pill used in Traditional Chinese medicine to "promote blood flow, remove blood stasis, dispel cold and relieve pain". It is aromatic and tastes pungent and bitter. It is used in cases of "menstrual disorder caused by blood stasis together with cold, accompanied by distension and pain in the lower abdomen, lumbago and leukorrhea". The binding agent is honey.

Chinese classic herbal formula

See also
 Chinese classic herbal formula
 Bu Zhong Yi Qi Wan

References

Traditional Chinese medicine pills